Columbia College, also known as Columbia College of Missouri, is a private college based in Columbia, Missouri. Founded in 1851 as a nonsectarian college, it has retained a covenant with the Christian Church (Disciples of Christ) since its inception. In addition to its main campus, the college operates 34 "extended campuses" in 13 U.S. states and one in Cuba, with 18 of them on U.S. military bases. One third of Columbia's almost 10,000 students are associated with the U.S. military.

History

1850s
Christian Female College received its charter from the Missouri Legislature on January 18, 1851, making it the first women's college west of the Mississippi River to be chartered by a state legislature. The city of Columbia strongly supported female education, in part because the University of Missouri did not yet admit women. Columbia was also home to Stephens College, founded in 1833 and chartered in 1856. Infrastructure was a problem; the first classes were held in an unfinished mansion.

A typical day for female students in 1851 started at 6 a.m. with a morning walk, followed by worship in the chapel. They attended classes until late afternoon and then wrote a daily composition. After they studied and did chores, the students attended a Bible lecture every evening. They studied arithmetic, ancient history, grammar, ancient geography, philosophy, the five books of Moses, and composition. The college purchased the estate of Dr. James Bennett and formally dedicated the buildings and grounds as the Christian College campus in 1852. By 1856, there were 150 students, including 85 boarders.

1860s
In the chaos of the Civil War, Christian College President Joseph K. Rogers vowed to keep the school open. The majority of the city of Columbia was pro-Union but the surrounding agricultural areas of Boone County and the rest of central Missouri were decidedly pro-slavery. Rogers was successful, thanks in part to faculty who relinquished pay.

President Rogers insisted the college remain neutral and did not allow newspapers on the grounds, but privately he read them. As the fighting continued, so did the fight for the college's survival. Only three students graduated in 1862 and four the following year. But Christian College never missed a day of classes. After the war, Christian College saw its largest enrollment to date with 182 students taught by nine faculty members.

1890s–1920s
Growth continued through the start of the 20th century, especially under Luella St. Clair Moss, a "steam engine in petticoats." St. Clair served three different terms as president of the college between 1893 and 1920 and was one of the first female college presidents in the country.

During her administration, she spearheaded the construction of four new buildings — St. Clair Hall, Dorsey Hall, Launer Auditorium and Missouri Hall — all of which are still in use today. She doubled the size of the faculty, held the first Ivy Chain ceremony, launched a college magazine, created a college orchestra, started a women's basketball team and implemented the then-innovative cap-and-gown uniform, which students wore in public. She also changed the college from a four-year school to one of the first accredited junior colleges in the country.

1960s–present
In 1970 the college changed from a four-year conservative all-female college to a liberal coeducational college, and changed its name to Columbia College. Between 1970 and 1971, more than 70 courses as daring as cycling and flying were added to the curriculum; all graduation requirements except freshman English and a GPA of 2.5 were dropped; more foreign students were admitted; and a host of lifestyle choices such as off-campus living for juniors, a relaxed dress code, and smoking were allowed. President W. Merle Hill said in 1971 that the time had come to openly allow discussions of poverty, the Vietnam War, racism, sex, drugs and abortion. All this was a radical departure from the college's conservative heritage and alienated some students and alumni.

President W. Merle Hill said in 1971, “I would like to bring education screaming and kicking into the 1970s. Then we would only be about 70 years behind ... Instead of pounding something into students’ heads, you have to permit young people to create their own lifestyle. If you dictate, they will rebel. The best way to teach is to let your own lifestyle be such that they want to follow, not rebel.”

The college began educating military personnel in St. Louis at the request of the military, making it one of the first colleges in the country with extended campuses on military bases. This was the start of the Extended Studies Division first headed up by Dr. William Brown, who would later go on to serve as Executive Vice President of the college. Two years later, the college launched the Evening Campus, geared to adult learners. Today, the college has 33 extended campuses around the country serving more than 25,000 military and civilian students each year, including one in Guantanamo Bay, Cuba.

In 1995, Columbia College offered its first graduate degree with a Master of Arts in Teaching, followed by a Master of Business Administration and a Master of Science in Criminal Justice. These degrees are offered through evening classes in Columbia, Mo., and at select extended campuses around the country. In 2000, the college launched its Online Campus, which now offers more than 500 online courses and 18 online degrees.

The Columbia College Cougars women's volleyball program captured two consecutive National Association of Intercollegiate Athletics (NAIA) championships in 1998 and 1999 with perfect 45-0 and 44-0 records, respectively. And in honor of what would have been alumna Jane Froman’s 100th birthday, a centennial celebration was held at Columbia College November 9–11, 2007. A DVD of the movie, "With a Song in my Heart," with added new segments, also premiered.

Academics
The college's academic divisions include:

Visual Arts and Music Department
Business Administration Department
Computer and Mathematical Sciences Department
Criminal Justice and Human Services Department
Division of Adult Higher Education
Education Department
Evening Campus Office
Graduate Studies
History and Political Science Department
Humanities Department
International Programs
Nursing Program
Psychology and Sociology Department
Science Department

Rankings
In 2014, Columbia College was named a "Best Midwestern College" by The Princeton Review.

Athletics

The Columbia athletic teams are called the Cougars. The college is a member of the National Association of Intercollegiate Athletics (NAIA), primarily competing in the American Midwest Conference (AMC) since the 1986–87 academic year.

Columbia competes in 18 intercollegiate varsity sports: Men's sports include baseball, basketball, cross country, golf, lacrosse, soccer and track & field; while women's sports include basketball, bowling, cross country, golf, soccer, softball, track & field and volleyball; and co-ed sports include competitive cheer, competitive dance and eSports.

Women's basketball
Columbia College re-instated women's basketball as a varsity sport in 2000 and the team played its first game on Nov. 6, 2001 vs. Wesleyan University. In 2008, the Lady Cougars advanced to the AMC title game, falling to McKendree University of Illinois, 78–66. Sophomore forward Rachel Oswald was named Newcomer of the Year. The Lady Cougars are coached by Taylor Possail.

Men's basketball
Bob Burchard has led the Cougar basketball program for the last 25 years. A perennial powerhouse in the NAIA, the Cougars were 35–1 in the 2012–13 season. Columbia spent eight consecutive weeks ranked #1 in the nation and advanced to the quarterfinals of the NAIA tournament as the overall #1 seed. The 2012–13 NABC National Coach of the Year, Burchard has compiled a 632–226 (.737) record at Columbia giving him the most in wins in program history. The Cougars have averaged 25 victories per season under his guidance. This transition took many by surprise because the 14 seasons prior to Burchard's arrival, the Cougars recorded a 98–224 (.304) record. The Cougars have advanced to the NAIA Men's National Basketball Championship 17 times in his tenure, including 16 of the past 19 seasons. In the 2008–09 season Columbia advanced to the NAIA National Championship Game. Burchard has been named conference Coach of the Year eight times, most recently 2012–13 when the Cougars swept the American Midwest Conference with a 16–0 record. Among all active coaches in the NAIA Division I, Burchard stands at fifth in most wins with 632 and third highest winning percentage (.737).

Men's soccer
Men's Cougar soccer has also seen some successes; in 2006, the soccer team finished second in the conference with an overall record of 11–7–1. The soccer team is coached by John Klein.

Softball
The softball program won three straight AMC Tournament Championships from 2001 to 2004 and won again in 2008. Head coach Wendy Spratt has achieved 500 victories with a win over Northwestern Oklahoma State University in April 2007.

The AMC named pitcher Valerie Teter the league's most valuable player and freshman of the year in 2008. Teter threw a two-hitter and stuck out 10 in five innings, adding a grand slam in the second inning. AMC's Pitcher of the Year award went to Katie McMahon for the second straight season in 2008 following a 16–4 record with a 1.61 ERA, and 138 strikeouts in 135 innings. McMahon is the eighth Columbia College player since 1999 to earn the league's top pitching honor; other two-time winners from Columbia College were Jayne Miller and Monica Mueller.

Women's volleyball
The women's volleyball program has been successful in NAIA Division I, with three perfect seasons and championships in 1998, 1999, 2001 and 2015.

In the late 1990s, the husband-and-wife team of Wayne and Coach Susan Kreklow drove the team to the NAIA National Tournament six times and won five regional championships and seven consecutive American Midwest Conference championships. In 1998 and 1999, Columbia College achieved consecutive undefeated seasons with a combined record of 85–0. The Cougars' undefeated record included 78 consecutive wins at home and 227 consecutive game victories.

In 1997 and 1998, the Kreklows shared NAIA/AVCA National Coach of the Year and Midwest Region Coach of the Year honors. In 1999, the coaching tandem took home the regional award for the fifth consecutive year. In 1998 and 1999, the Kreklows also received the NAIA National Tournament Coach of the Year award. After the 1999 season, both Kreklows left the Cougars, but did not go far - just two miles down the city's College Avenue, where Wayne took the head coaching job with the Missouri Tigers and Susan became Director of Volleyball for Mizzou.

The Kreklows also started the men's volleyball program at Columbia College in 1997. In 1999, the Cougars finished the season with a 19–5 overall record, enjoying their second consecutive undefeated run through the Midwest Intercollegiate Volleyball Association. They also took second place at the inaugural SSI Volleyball National Invitational Tournament in 1999. In 2000 the Men's Team won the NAIA championship; although the Kreklows were not there for the entire season, they are the coaches who put the team together and coached them for the first part of the year. The men's volleyball program has since been disbanded.

In 2000, with a team composed of ten freshmen and three sophomores, the Lady Cougars finished 44-2 for a second-place finish at the NAIA National Tournament. Coach Melinda Wrye-Washington was named American Midwest Conference and NAIA Region V Coach of the Year.  In 2001, the Lady Cougars returned to perfect form as NAIA champions with a 38–0 record.

In 2015, the squad finished with a record of 33–7 winning the AMC Conference Tournament championship and NAIA National Tournament. Outside hitter Penny Liu was named the NAIA Player of the Year and First Team All-American. Sashiko Heredia was names Second Team All-American while head coach Melinda Wrye-Washington was named the NAIA Volleyball Coach of the Year.

Columbia College Global (CCG)

In addition to its main campus in Columbia, Missouri, Columbia College operates 38 nationwide locations in 14 U.S. states and one in Cuba with 20 of them on U.S. military bases.

A breakdown of the college's nationwide locations are below:

Alabama

 Redstone Arsenal

California

 Imperial
 Lemoore
 Los Alamitos
 San Diego
 San Luis Obispo

Colorado

 Denver

Cuba

 NB Guantanamo Bay

Florida

 Jacksonville
 NAS Jacksonville
 Orlando
 Tavares

Georgia

 Fort Stewart
 Hunter Army Airfield
 NSB Kings Bay

Hawaii

 USCG Honolulu

Illinois

 Crystal Lake
 Elgin
 Freeport
 Lake County / NS Great Lakes

Missouri

 Columbia (Day Campus / Evening Campus)
 Fort Leonard Wood
 Jefferson City
 Kansas City
 Lake of the Ozarks
 Moberly
 Rolla
 Springfield
 St. Louis
 Waynesville
 Whiteman AFB

North Dakota

 Minot AFB

Oklahoma

 Fort Sill

South Dakota

 Ellsworth AFB

Texas

 NASJRB Fort Worth
 Mesquite

Utah

 Salt Lake City

Washington

 NS Everett / Marysville
 NAS Whidbey Island

Notable alumni
Sandy Adams, former US Congresswomen from Florida 
Avery Bourne '14; current member of the Illinois House of Representatives
Deborah Bryant '65, Miss America 1966
Jane Froman '26, 1930-1950s singer, actress
Arliss Howard '76, actor, writer and director
Tim Kennedy (Criminal Justice '02), wrestler; retired mixed martial artist who competed in the middleweight division of the Ultimate Fighting Championship
Gloria McCloskey, All-American Girls Professional Baseball League player, voted Christian College’s Athletic Queen in 1955
Sally Rand (attended 1919), notorious fan dancer and early movie star
Lavinia "Vinnie" Ream (attended 1857), sculptor of Lincoln statue in U.S. Capitol rotunda
Clem Smith, current Missouri State Representative from St. Louis County
Julie Stevens (1918-1984), radio actress
Margaret Rose Sanford, First Lady of North Carolina
Larry Young '76; bronze medal racewalking, '68 Mexico City and '72 Munich Olympics; sculptor
Ron Stallworth '07; African-American police officer responsible for infiltrating the KKK, author of Black Klansman (2014)
Charles McGee '78; Tuskegee Airman, Brigadier general

Notable faculty

Judy Baker, former Missouri state representative

References

Bibliography

External links

 
 Official athletics website

 
Universities and colleges affiliated with the Christian Church (Disciples of Christ)
Educational institutions established in 1851
Private universities and colleges in Missouri
Universities and colleges in Columbia, Missouri
Former women's universities and colleges in the United States
1851 establishments in Missouri